Thomas Singleton was an English footballer, who played as a full back in the Football League for Peterborough United, Chester and Bradford Park Avenue.

Singleton began his career with Blackpool. He made only one appearance for the Seasiders, then under the leadership of Ron Suart, and it was in their League Cup Second Round replay extra-time defeat to Leeds United at Bloomfield Road on 5 October 1960.

References

1940 births
2005 deaths
Association football fullbacks
Sportspeople from Blackpool
English footballers
Blackpool F.C. players
Peterborough United F.C. players
Chester City F.C. players
Bradford (Park Avenue) A.F.C. players
Fleetwood Town F.C. players
English Football League players